Jonathan Glynn (born 7 June 1993) is a former Irish  hurler who  played as a forward for the Galway senior team.

Glynn made his first appearance for the senior team during the 2012 championship and was part of the Galway panel until his retirement in 2020 at the age of 26. He was a key member of Galway's 2017 All Ireland winning side. 

Also, an All-Ireland medalist in the minor grade, Glynn has won one Leinster medal in the senior grade.

At club level, Glynn played with the Ardrahan club.

Career
Glynn missed all of the 2016 season but returned to the Galway panel in April 2017 after returning from New York City where he played football for New York. He will continue to be based in New York but will return for Galway matches when required.			
On 22 April 2017, he came on as a substitute as Galway won the 2017 National Hurling League after a 3-21 to 0-14 win against Tipperary in the final.	
On 3 September 2017, Glynn started for Galway as they won their first All-Ireland Senior Hurling Championship in 29 years against Waterford.

On 13 April 2020, he revealed that he and his fiancée had tested COVID-19 positive. Later that month he announced his retirement from inter-county hurling.

Career statistics

Honours

Galway
 All-Ireland Senior Hurling Championship (1): 2017 
Leinster Senior Hurling Championship (2): 2012, 2018
National Hurling League (1): 2017
All-Ireland Minor Hurling Championship (1): 2011

References

1993 births
Living people
Ardrahan hurlers
Galway inter-county hurlers
New York Gaelic footballers
Connacht inter-provincial hurlers